Rolf Maartmann (3 November 1887 – 8 July 1941) was a Norwegian football player. He was born in Kristiania. He played for the club Lyn, and also for the Norwegian national team. He competed at the 1912 Summer Olympics in Stockholm. He was Norwegian champion with Lyn in 1908, 1909, 1910 and 1911. He was the twin brother of Erling Maartmann.

References

1887 births
1941 deaths
Footballers from Oslo
Norwegian footballers
Norway international footballers
Lyn Fotball players
Footballers at the 1912 Summer Olympics
Olympic footballers of Norway
Norwegian twins
Twin sportspeople
Association football forwards